Associação Atlética Internacional, or simply Inter de Bebedouro, is a Brazilian football team based in Bebedouro, São Paulo. Founded in 1906, it plays in Campeonato Paulista Segunda Divisão.

History
The club was founded on June 11, 1906. They won the Taça Estado de São Paulo in 1979.

Achievements

 Copa Paulista de Futebol:
 Winners (1): 1979

Stadium
Associação Atlética Internacional play their home games at Estádio Sócrates Stamato. The stadium has a maximum capacity of 15,300 people.

References

 
Football clubs in São Paulo (state)
Association football clubs established in 1906
1906 establishments in Brazil